Fontinhas is a civil parish in the municipality of Praia da Vitória, Terceira Island in the Portuguese Azores. It contains the localities Acima do Cabouco, Canada da Fonte, Canada do Barreiro, Canada do Coxo, Canada do Pico, Canada dos Batistas, Canada dos Doidos, Fontinha and Fontinhas.

References

Freguesias of Praia da Vitória